The Cholsey and Wallingford Railway is a  long standard gauge heritage railway in the English county of Oxfordshire.

History

The first proposals for the Cholsey to Wallingford line date from 1861, and envisaged an independently owned route from Cholsey to Princes Risborough via Wallingford, Benson, Watlington and Chinnor.  This line would have been a through route, with junctions with the Great Western Railway at Cholsey and the Wycombe Railway at Princes Risborough.  In 1862, a Bill was presented to Parliament for a short branch from Cholsey to Wallingford, but this was withdrawn early in 1863, before it had come up for consideration. It was replaced by the Wallingford and Watlington Railway Bill which was passed by Parliament in July 1864.

The W&WR opened as far as Wallingford on 2 July 1866. Unfortunately, two months earlier, in May 1866, the Overend, Gurney & Co bank had crashed, causing the severest financial crisis of the nineteenth century. The Bank Rate was raised to 10%, making it impossible for the W&WR to raise the capital for its planned continuation to Watlington. In 1871, Parliament consented to the railway abandoning its plans for the line beyond Wallingford. The company was sold to the GWR in 1872.

The railway became popularly known as the Wallingford Bunk. The Curator of the Cholsey and Wallingford Railway Museum attributes the following story to the late Mrs Harold Gale. "Around the turn of the century, the loco did a 'bunk'. It left Cholsey station without its coaches. Harold and Len Gale, returning from football in Reading, had uncoupled the loco while it waited in the bay platform."

The line closed to passengers in 1959, and the last British Rail goods traffic into the old Wallingford Station ran in 1965. However most of the line was retained to serve the maltings adjacent to the railway to the south of Hithercroft Road, Wallingford.  Rail service to this plant ceased in 1981 when BR removed the junction at Cholsey. The Cholsey and Wallingford Railway Preservation Society was then formed to conserve the line for tourist services.  It first ran train rides for the public in 1985, with regular advertised services over the full available length of the line beginning in 1997.  Steam traction has also been reintroduced.

Services
Most services on the Cholsey and Wallingford Railway are currently hauled by the resident diesel locomotives with visiting steam locomotives for special events. Trains run on weekends and bank holidays between April and September, and at Halloween and Christmas.  The railway's web site has details of operating days.

The original branch platform at Cholsey station is now used by the CWR, and trains connect there with Great Western Railway stopping services on the Great Western Main Line between Reading and Didcot stations.

The original Wallingford railway station and the last segment of the line have long been built on, and the old station site is now crossed, ironically, by Beeching Way. The line now terminates at a makeshift station which is the railway's headquarters on Hithercroft Road (formerly known as Old Moor Lane). The new station is adjacent to the site of the maltings that kept the line alive into the preservation era. The maltings were demolished early in the new millennium and replaced by housing, releasing some extra land to the railway.  The CWR plans to build a permanent station when resources are available.

Rolling stock

Locomotives
The line is the home to several diesel locomotives, including three of British Rail's ubiquitous Class 08 shunters, which are used on most trains. Steam also currently operates on the railway, by locomotives Peckett 2142 and 6515 Isebrook.

Operational
 British Rail Class 08  08 022 Lion, ex-Guinness Brewery, Park Royal, London (Operational, August 2022) (DE = diesel-electric)
 British Rail Class 08  08 060 Unicorn, ex-Guinness Brewery, Park Royal, London (Operational, August 2022)
 British Rail Class 08  08 123 George Mason (Operational, August 2022)
 Peckett & Sons  Works No 2142 Northern Gas Board No 1, owned by the Darlington Railway Preservation Society. (Operational, August 2022)
 12 Sentinel  Sentinel Works No 6515, privately owned. (Operational, August 2022)

Not operational
 Hibberd  Carpenter, ex-Guinness Brewery, Park Royal, London (under repair, July 2017) (DM = diesel mechanical)

Railcars
 One Wickham trolley

Carriage and wagon
The line has a varied collection of passenger carriages and freight wagons.

Gallery

Notes

References

External links

 The official Cholsey and Wallingford Railway web site

Heritage railways in Oxfordshire
Railway companies established in 1861
Railway lines opened in 1866
Railway companies disestablished in 1872
Rail transport in Berkshire
Rail transport in Oxfordshire
Wallingford, Oxfordshire
1861 establishments in England